Joshua Jones or Josh Jones may refer to:

People
 Joshua A. Jones, American media executive
 Joshua "Rookie" Jones, American baseball player
 Josh Jones (rugby) (born 1993), English rugby league player
 Josh Jones (safety) (born 1994), American football safety
 Josh Jones (offensive lineman) (born 1997), American football offensive lineman

Other uses
 Joshua Jones (TV series), a 1992 Welsh stop-motion children's television series

 
Jones, Joshua